= Muttukad =

Human settlement in India

Muttukad is a village in Idukki district, Kerala, India.

Muttukadu at Chinnakkanal panchayat, which has the highest number of paddy fields, is known as the Kuttanad of the high range. Kuttanad in Alappuzha district is known as the rice bowl of Kerala. Earlier, Muttukadu had nearly 100 hectares of fields, which has come down to about 50 hectares now.
